The 1963 San Diego mayoral election was held on November 5, 1963 to elect the mayor for San Diego. Incumbent mayor Charles Dail did not stand for reelection. In the primary election, Frank Curran and Murray Goodrich received the most votes and advanced to the runoff. Curran was then elected mayor with a majority of the votes.

Candidates
Frank Curran, member of the San Diego City Council
Murray D. Goodrich, businessman
David S. Casey, attorney
Allen Hitch, member of the San Diego City Council
Helen R. Cobb, member of the San Diego City Council
Donald J. Hartley
Gerard A. Dougherty
Joseph Costa
Kenneth W. Olson
William Matselboba Sr.
John B. Schneider
Juan Rivera Rosario

Campaign
Incumbent Mayor Charles Dail did not stand for reelection due to failing health and declining power related to a recall attempt. The election drew a crowded field, including three members of the San Diego City Council: Frank Curran, Helen Cobb, and Alan Hitch. Other major contenders included David Casey, an attorney, and Murray Goodrich, a surplus aircraft parts dealer and aluminum smelter. 

On September 17, 1963, Frank Curran came in first in the primary election with 22.4 percent of the vote, followed by Murray D. Goodrich in second with 21.0 percent, David S. Casey in third with 20.4 percent and Allen Hitch in fourth with 17.7 percent. None of the other remaining eight candidates received more than 10 percent of the vote. Because no candidate received a majority of the vote, a runoff election was held between the top two finishers, Curran and Goodrich. On November 5, 1963 Curran received a majority of 63.6 percent of the vote in the runoff and was elected to the office of the mayor.

Primary Election results

General Election results

References

1963
1963 California elections
1963 United States mayoral elections
1960s in San Diego
November 1963 events in the United States